Lytoceras sutile is an ammonite species belonging to the family Lytoceratidae. These cephalopods were fast-moving nektonic carnivores.

Fossil record
Fossils of Lytoceras sutile have been found from the Jurassic to the Cretaceous (age range: from 150.8 to 136.4 million years ago). They are known from various localities of Italy, Austria and Czechoslovakia.

References

Jurassic ammonites
Lytoceratidae